The Consumer Protection from Unfair Trading Regulations 2008 is a statutory instrument in the United Kingdom made under the European Communities Act 1972. It came into force on 26 May 2008. It is effectively the successor to the Trade Descriptions Act 1968, which it largely repeals. It is designed to implement the Unfair Commercial Practices Directive, as part of a common set of European minimum standards for consumer protection.

Contents
The Regulations introduce new rules about consumer protection and the responsibility of businesses to trade fairly. It places a general duty on traders not to trade unfairly.

The regulations also include a blacklist of 31 banned trading practices.

Enforcement
In February 2011, Safestyle UK became the first company to be prosecuted under the regulations. In an action brought by North Lincolnshire Council Trading Standards Department they were found guilty under paragraph 25, (ignoring a request not to return) and fined £4000 with £18000 costs for repeatedly calling on a consumer in Scunthorpe.

See also
Unfair Commercial Practices Directive
Unfair Terms in Consumer Contracts Directive
Product Liability Directive
English contract law
EU law

Notes

External links
 Text of the Regulations as enacted, from the Office of Public Sector Information.
 BBC News - New rules for consumer protection

United Kingdom contract law
2008 in British law
Statutory Instruments of the United Kingdom
Consumer protection in the United Kingdom
Consumer protection legislation